Stückelberger may refer to:

Hansjürg Stückelberger (born 1930), a Swiss writer and pastor 
Christine Stückelberger (born 1947), a Swiss equestrian
Ernst Stückelberg (1831-1903) a.k.a. Stückelberger, a Swiss painter